Juha-Pekka Haataja (born October 31, 1982) is a Finnish professional ice hockey winger. He currently plays for KooKoo of the Finnish Liiga.

Playing career
In the 2012–13 season, he had the most points in the SM-Liiga at 59 while playing for Oulun Kärpät. Haataja spent parts of two seasons with Modo Hockey in the Swedish Hockey League before returning to the Liiga, signing a deal with KooKoo on October 12, 2015. In the 2019–20 season, on November 20, 2019, Haataja scored the 95th power-play goal of her league career, with which he became the player with the highest number of power-play goals in the regular season in the Finnish Liiga, overtaking Janne Ojanen.

Awards, honors and records

Career statistics

Regular season and playoffs

International

References

External links

1982 births
Living people
Atlant Moscow Oblast players
HIFK (ice hockey) players
KooKoo players
Lukko players
Modo Hockey players
Oulun Kärpät players
Sportspeople from Oulu
Finnish ice hockey right wingers